Lipinia vulcania, also known as the vulcan lipinia, is a species of skink endemic to the Philippines. It is known from two specimens: the holotype was collected at ca. 1700 m above sea level on Mindanao Island in 1857, and another one in southern Luzon in 1956.

References

Lipinia
Reptiles of the Philippines
Endemic fauna of the Philippines
Reptiles described in 1857
Taxa named by Charles Frédéric Girard